Red Sunset Park is a public park in Gresham, Oregon, United States.

External links

 Red Sunset Park at the City of Gresham, Oregon

Gresham, Oregon
Municipal parks in Oregon